Hymenobacter deserti  is a Gram-negative, rod-shaped and non-motile bacterium from the genus of Hymenobacter which has been isolated from soil from the desert of Xinjiang in China.

References

External links
Type strain of Hymenobacter deserti at BacDive -  the Bacterial Diversity Metadatabase

Further reading 
 

deserti
Bacteria described in 2009